Thérèse-De Blainville is a regional county municipality in the Laurentides region of Quebec, Canada. It is located immediately north of Laval on the north shore of the Rivière des Mille-Îles.

The population according to the 2016 Canadian Census was 157,103.

Subdivisions
There are 7 subdivisions within the RCM:

Cities & Towns (7)
 Blainville
 Bois-des-Filion
 Boisbriand
 Lorraine
 Rosemère
 Sainte-Anne-des-Plaines
 Sainte-Thérèse

Transportation

Access Routes
Highways and numbered routes that run through the municipality, including external routes that start or finish at the county border:

 Autoroutes
 
 
 

 Principal Highways
 
 

 Secondary Highways
 
 

 External Routes
 None

See also
 List of regional county municipalities and equivalent territories in Quebec

References

Regional county municipalities in Laurentides
Census divisions of Quebec